Andrew Hick (born ) is an Australian former rugby league footballer who played professionally in England and Australia.

Playing career
Hick played for the Engadine Dragons before making his début for the local Cronulla-Sutherland Sharks in the NSWRL Premiership in 1991. He played in 44 matches for the Sharks over the next five years before transferring to the Western Suburbs Magpies in 1996. In 1997 he switched to Super League, joining the new Adelaide Rams franchise.

In 1999 Hick moved to England, spending one season each with the new Gateshead Thunder club in 1999 and Hull F.C. in 2000. He was one of several former Sharks players who played for the Thunder. Hick retired at the end of the 2000 season.

References

1971 births
Living people
Adelaide Rams players
Australian rugby league players
Cronulla-Sutherland Sharks players
Gateshead Thunder (1999) players
Hull F.C. players
Rugby league players from Sydney
Rugby league props
Rugby league second-rows
Western Suburbs Magpies players